Margaret Joan Roberts (1937 – 4 March 2017) was a South African herbalist and author of over 40 books on herbs and related topics. Margaret Roberts brought herbs into South Africa over 60 years ago and gave lectures about the benefits of herbs and healthy living, her motto was to 'Educate and Inspire'. 
The Margaret Roberts Herbal Centre in De Wildt, North West Province was developed by Margaret and is named after her, this continues with her daughter Sandy Roberts who has worked with Margaret for 32 years. Margaret has lent her name to product ranges including food ranges, toiletries, gifts, kitchenware, stationery, textiles, seeds and books. The Margaret Roberts Herbal Centre is known to be one of the top ten gardens in South Africa. Margaret is well known for her Margaret Roberts lavenders which she cross cultivated over 15 years and which is endemic to South Africa, also known for her Ginger Rosemary, High Hopes Basil and Margaret Roberts Rose, all of these varieties are named after her.

She was a qualified physiotherapist and has received a Laureate Award from the University of Pretoria for being one of South Africa's first organic farmers.

Books
Margaret Roberts wrote more than 40 books on herbs and related topics.

These include:
A-Z of Herbs
The Essential Margaret Roberts: My 100 Favourite Herbs
Edible and Medicinal Flowers
Alles oor Kruie (Afrikaans)
Companion Planting
Plantmaats (Afrikaans)
Pregnancy and Child Care for Healthy Living
Healing Foods
The Forest Fairies and the Great Battle
Herbal Teas for Healthy Living
Pot-Pourri making
Herbal Beauty for Healthy Living
The Lavender Book
100 Edible & Healing Flowers: Cultivating, Cooking, Restoring Health
My 100 Favourite Herbs
100 New Herbs including weeds 
Tissue Salts for Children: Babies, Tots, Teens
Tissue Salts for Healthy Living
Anti-aging Tissue salts
Indigenous Healing plants including foraging plants

References

South African physiotherapists
1937 births
2017 deaths
Herbalists
South African women writers